In elementary algebra, root rationalisation is a process by which radicals in the denominator of an algebraic fraction are eliminated.

This technique may be extended to any algebraic denominator, by multiplying the numerator and the denominator by all algebraic conjugates of the denominator, and expanding the new denominator into the norm of the old denominator. However, except in special cases, the resulting fractions may have huge numerators and denominators, and, therefore, the technique is generally used only in the above elementary cases.

Rationalisation of a monomial square root and cube root 

For the fundamental technique, the numerator and denominator must be multiplied by the same factor.

Example 1:

 

To rationalise this kind of expression, bring in the factor :

 

The square root disappears from the denominator, because  by definition of a square root:

 
which is the result of the rationalisation.

Example 2:

 

To rationalise this radical, bring in the factor :

 

The cube root disappears from the denominator, because it is cubed; so

  

which is the result of the rationalisation.

Dealing with more square roots 

For a denominator that is:

Rationalisation can be achieved by multiplying by the conjugate:

and applying the difference of two squares identity, which here will yield −1. To get this result, the entire fraction should be multiplied by

This technique works much more generally. It can easily be adapted to remove one square root at a time, i.e. to rationalise

by multiplication by

Example:

The fraction must be multiplied by a quotient containing .

Now, we can proceed to remove the square roots in the denominator:

 

Example 2:

This process also works with complex numbers with 

The fraction must be multiplied by a quotient containing .

Generalizations

Rationalisation can be extended to all algebraic numbers and algebraic functions (as an application of norm forms). For example, to rationalise a cube root, two linear factors involving cube roots of unity should be used, or equivalently a quadratic factor.

References
This material is carried in classic algebra texts. For example:

George Chrystal, Introduction to Algebra: For the Use of Secondary Schools and Technical Colleges is a nineteenth-century text, first edition 1889, in print; a trinomial example with square roots is on p. 256, while a general theory of rationalising factors for surds is on pp. 189–199.

Elementary algebra
Fractions (mathematics)